The Riodinini are one of the large tribes of metalmark butterflies (family Riodinidae). As numerous Riodinidae genera have not yet been unequivocally assigned to a tribe, the genus list is preliminary.

Selected genera

Amarynthis
Amphiselenis
Ancyluris 
Baeotis
Barbicornis
Brachyglenis
Calephelis
Caria
Cariomothis
Cartea
Chalodeta
Chamaelimnas
Charis
Chorinea
Colaciticus
Crocozona
Cyrenia 
Dachetola
Detritivora
Exoplisia
Isapis
Ithomeis
Lasaia
Lymnas
Lyropteryx
Melanis
Metacharis
Monethe
Nahida
Necyria
Nirodia
Notheme
Panara
Paraphthonia
Parcella
Pheles includes Lepricornis
Riodina
Rhetus
Seco
Siseme
Syrmatia 
Themone

species gallery 

 
Riodininae
Butterfly tribes